Solitary Confinement is a 1992 album by Leæther Strip. Released by Zoth Ommog Records, it continued the heavy electro-industrial style of Science for the Satanic Citizen. As is usually the case, it incorporated a number of voice samples, for instance from the film A Boy and His Dog.

Track listing
Mortal Thoughts
Strap Me Down
I Am Your Conscience
Nothing Seen-Nothing Done
Dance of Deception
Evil Speaks
Adrenalin Rush
Crash Flight 232/92 
Croatia
Red Meat Attraction
Jantes Revenge
Antius [Psycho Strip Edit][*]

References

Leæther Strip albums
1992 albums
Zoth Ommog Records albums